Abercorn is a rural town and locality in the North Burnett Region, Queensland, Australia.

Geography
The Burnett River forms the eastern boundary of Abercorn. Three Moon Creek passes close to the town and across the locality into the Burnett River. The Burnett Highway passes through the locality but there is no direct access from the highway to the town; to get to Abercorn, the turn-off from the highway is onto Wuruma Dam Road at Cynthia. There is a state forest in the north of the locality extending into Kapaldo.

History
The town takes its name from its railway station, which was named  on 19 June 1925 by the Queensland Railway Department, possibly after the champion thoroughbred horse Abercorn.

Abercorn State School opened on 3 May 1927.

Langley Flat Provisional School opened on 5 September 1927. In 1929 it became Langley Flat State School. It closed on 28 January 1947.

A post office opened in Abercorn about February 1928; it closed on 11 June 1986.

Goomaran Creek Provisional School opened on 29 April 1931. In 1932 it became Goomaran Creek State School. It closed on 9 May 1948.

Glen Loch State School opened on 27 August 1931 and closed in 1944. It was on the Burnett Highway (approx ).

Education
Abercorn State School is a government primary (P-7) school located at 957 Wuruma Dam Road. In 2012, the school had an enrolment of 21 students in a single classroom with 3 teachers (1.5 full-time equivalent). There is no secondary school in Abercorn; the nearest one is in Monto.

Attractions
Abercorn is the gateway to Wuruma Dam used for water sports and fishing.

References

Further reading
  — covers Abercorn, Cynthia Creek, Goomaram Creek, and Nogo Creek schools
 — includes Glen Loch State School and Langley Flat State School

External links

 

Towns in Queensland
North Burnett Region
Localities in Queensland